The United Nations Observer Mission in South Africa (UNOMSA) was a United Nations peacekeeping mission to South Africa from 1992 to 1994. The mission was led by Angela King and was headquartered in Johannesburg, with a regional office in Durban.

History

Background

Establishment 
The United Nations Observer Mission in South Africa was established on 17 August 1992 by United Nations Security Council Resolution 772. The first 13 observers arrived in South Africa on 13 September.

On 14 January 1994, United Nations Security Council Resolution 894 expanded the role of the mission to include election monitoring.

The mission ended on 27 June 1994.

Budget 
From 1994 to 1995, the United States contributed  to the mission.

References

Citations

Bibliography

Further reading 

 

1992 in South Africa
1993 in South Africa
1994 in South Africa
United Nations operations in Africa
South Africa and the United Nations